Sieng Chanthea (Khmer: សៀង ចន្ធា: born 9 September 2002), is a Cambodian professional footballer who plays as a forward for Boeung Ket and the Cambodian national team in various levels. He made his senior debut in a 2–0 victory against Pakistan in the 2022 FIFA World Cup qualification on 6 June 2019, becoming the youngest player to score a goal for Cambodia and in a FIFA World Cup qualification match at the age of 16 years old.

Club career

Bati Academy
Chanthea is a product of the Football Federation of Cambodia's academy, Bati Academy.

Boeung Ket
After an impressive display for his country, on 12 December 2019, it was announced that Chanthea will be joining Cambodian League side Boeung Ket starting in the 2020 league season.

International career

Chanthea has represented Cambodia national football team in multiple youth and senior level. He made his senior debut in the 2–0 win against Pakistan on 6 June 2019 where he also scored his first goal as a senior player after coming on as a substitute in the 81st minute.

On 10 December 2019, Chanthea scored the fastest goal in the history of South East Asian Games. The goal was scored within 18 seconds of the start of the match against Myanmar whose marauding run ended with the ball finding the back of the net.

International goal

U23

National team

Honours and Individual Record

References

External links
 
 

2002 births
Living people
Cambodian footballers
Cambodia international footballers
Association football forwards
People from Koh Kong province
Competitors at the 2021 Southeast Asian Games
Southeast Asian Games competitors for Cambodia